William Ronald Callaway (born March 11, 1940) is an American retired voice actor. He is also known as Bill Callaway and Bill Calloway. He is known for playing Aquaman in Super Friends.

Filmography

Animated roles
 Aladdin - Zarasto
 Bonkers - Vic "Stiff Lips" Sullivan
 Captain Caveman and the Teen Angels - Additional voices
 Cattanooga Cats - Country
 Challenge of the GoBots - Additional voices
 Challenge of the Super Friends - Aquaman, Bizarro
 Darkwing Duck - Comet Guy
 Defenders of the Earth - Garax
 Drak Pack - Frankie, Howler
 Droopy, Master Detective - Rumpley
 DuckTales - Old Man Ribbit
 Fantastic Max - Additional voices (Season 2)
 Foofur - Burt
 Galtar and the Golden Lance - Additional Voices
 G.I. Joe - Beach Head
 Gomer Pyle: USMC - Dumbrowski
 Gunsmoke - Shuffles
 Help!... It's the Hair Bear Bunch! - Square Bear
 Inhumanoids - Dr. Herman Mangler/Nightcrawler, Jonathon Slattery/Liquidator
 Laverne & Shirley in the Army - Additional voices
 Lucky Luke - Lucky Luke
 Monchichis - Additional Voices
 My Smurfy Valentine - TV movie
 My Little Pony and Friends - Additional voices
 Pac-Man - Additional voices
 ProStars - Additional voices
 Quack Pack - Additional voices
 Richie Rich - Professor Keanbean
 Scooby-Doo and Scrappy-Doo - Additional voices
 Sealab 2020 - Sparks
 Super Friends - Aquaman
 Super Friends: The Legendary Super Powers Show - Additional voices
 Superman - Additional voices
 Spider-Man and His Amazing Friends - Angel
 The Dukes - Additional voices (Season 1)
 The Funtastic World of Hanna-Barbera - Professor Reggie von Goh
 The Incredible Hulk - Additional voices
 The Legend of Prince Valiant - Thor
 The Little Rascals - Additional voices
 The New Yogi Bear Show - Additional voices
 The Scooby & Scrappy-Doo/Puppy Hour - Additional voices
 The Smurfic Games (TV movie) - Clumsy Smurf, Painter Smurf, Dragon
 The Smurfs Christmas Special - TV special
 The Smurfs - Clumsy Smurf, Painter Smurf
 The Smurfs Springtime Special - Clumsy Smurf
 The Super Powers Team: Galactic Guardians - Aquaman
 The Voyages of Doctor Dolittle - Additional voices
 The World's Greatest Super Friends - Aquaman
 The Tom & Jerry Kids Show - Slowpoke Antonio
 Trollkins - Slug
 Wolf Rock TV - Additional voices

Film
 Cat Ballou - Loopy
 Daniel Boone - Young Daniel Boone, Running Fox
 G.I. Joe: Arise, Serpentor Arise - Beachhead
 G.I. Joe: The Movie - Beachhead
 Hank the Cowdog - Various Characters
 Hanna-Barbera's All-Star Comedy Ice Revue - Square Bear
 Here are the Smurfs (TV movie) - Clumsy Smurf 
 Scooby-Doo Meets the Boo Brothers - Ape, Beauregard's Ghost, Billy-Bob Scroggins, Ghost in the Attic, Headless Horseman
 Tis The Season to Be Smurfy (TV special) - Clumsy Smurf, Rich Man
 Ultraman: The Adventure Begins - Additional voices
 Yogi's Great Escape - Dad, Trapper

References

External links

Living people
American male voice actors
American male television actors
20th-century American male actors
1940 births
Male actors from Los Angeles
Hanna-Barbera people